European route E 263 is a Class B road part of the International E-road network. It runs only through Estonia, begins in Tallinn and ends in Luhamaa, Võru County, and shares exactly the same route as Estonian national road 2.

Route: Tallinn – Tartu – Võru – Luhamaa. 

Route
Harju County
Tallinn
 / Narva, Saint Petersburg
  Tallinn Airport
 Jüri / Keila, Paldiski
 Kose  Kehra, Jägala
 Kose  Juuru, Hagudi
Kose 
Ardu
Järva County
 Mäo  Pärnu/Rakvere
 Nurmsi  Koeru
Koigi
 Imavere  Võhma, Viljandi, Karksi-Nuia
Jõgeva County
Adavere
Põltsamaa
  Jõgeva
  Kõo, Võhma
Puurmani
Tartu County
 Kärevere  Kärkna
 Tähtvere  Tartu
Tartu
  Viljandi
 / Valga, Valmiera, Inčukalns / Jõhvi
Tõrvandi
Ülenurme
  Tartu Airport
 Reola  Põlva
 Tatra  Otepää, Sangaste
Kambja
Põlva County
 Saverna  Põlva
Kanepi
  Otepää, Rõngu
  Põlva, Räpina
Võru County
 Vagula  Sõmerpalu, Sangaste, Tõrva
Võru
  Põlva
  Räpina
  ->  Varstu, Valga
Vastseliina
Luhamaa /

Gallery

References

External links 
 UN Economic Commission for Europe: Overall Map of E-road Network (2007)

263
E263